Harold Hill Goldsmith is an American developmental psychologist and behavior geneticist.  He is the Mark and Ilene Laufman Family Professor and the Antoine Bascom Professor & Leona Tyler Professor of Psychology at the University of Wisconsin–Madison. He is also the Chair of the University's Department of Psychology and coordinator of the Social and Affective Processes Group at the University's Waisman Center. His research focuses on multiple topics in developmental psychology, such as children's emotional development, temperament, and autism spectrum disorders. He first joined the faculty of the University of Wisconsin–Madison in 1992 with his wife, Morton Ann Gernsbacher. He is a fellow of the American Association for the Advancement of Science.

References

External links
Faculty page

Living people
20th-century American psychologists
American developmental psychologists
Behavior geneticists
University of Wisconsin–Madison faculty
University of Minnesota alumni
Fellows of the American Association for the Advancement of Science
American geneticists
Year of birth missing (living people)